{{DISPLAYTITLE:C11H17NO}}
The molecular formula C11H17NO (molar mass :  179.25 g/mol, exact mass : 179.131014) may refer to:

 4-Ethoxyamphetamine
 3-Methoxymethamphetamine
 3-Methoxy-4-methylamphetamine
 Methoxyphenamine
 N-Methylephedrine
 N-Methylpseudoephedrine
 Paramethoxymethamphetamine
 Mexiletine